Harry Garcia is an American politician and businessman serving as a member of the New Mexico House of Representatives for the 69th district. He assumed office in 2016.

Career 
Garcia served as a member of the United States Marine Corps in the Vietnam War. After the war, Garcia operated his own business. Garcia was nominated to the New Mexico House of Representatives in 2016 to succeed former Speaker W. Ken Martinez. He took office on September 9, 2016 and was re-elected in 2018.

Personal life 
Garcia is a resident of Grants, New Mexico.

References 

Living people
Hispanic and Latino American state legislators in New Mexico
Democratic Party members of the New Mexico House of Representatives
Year of birth missing (living people)
Place of birth missing (living people)
21st-century American politicians
United States Marine Corps personnel of the Vietnam War